Tizaj may refer to:
 Tizaj, Hormozgan
 Tizaj, Qazvin